Dorley is a surname. Notable people with the surname include:

August Dorley (1842–1867), German soldier who fought in the American Civil War
Oscar Dorley (born 1998), Liberian footballer

See also
Doley
Dooley
Dorle
Dorsey (surname)